Milan Mučibabić, an author and journalist, was born in 1922 in Nevesinje, Bosnia and Herzegovina. After graduating from the construction engineering high school, he got a job in Steel Works in Zenica. In 1941, at the start of World War II, he joined the army as a partisan and participated in defending his country. After the war, we worked as a youth activist and later as a journalist for "Oslobodjenje" where he stayed until his early retirement in 1969 when he completely devoted himself to his literary work. As a journalist, he wrote particularly interesting reports about local villages, agriculture, and various pieces about people and happenings during and after the war. He is a recipient of numerous journalistic and literary awards and also the renowned Sixth of April Award which he received for his literary works. He published a number of books, the most notable of which was the trilogy "Stone and ashes" for which he received recognition as the best novel with a war theme. With that work, he concluded the series of novels and literature with the World War II theme. He died in 1985 in Sarajevo where he is also buried.

Books:

 From the other side of the trenches /1958./
 Landmarks /1964./
 The story about our youth /1967./
 The stone sea /1970./
 Bezdanica /1973./
 Romanija which lives /1974./
 The blooming colors of summer  /1975./
 Undefeated by time /1978./
 Stone and ashes I and II /1982./
 When children did not play war /1984./
 Stone and ashes III /1984./
 At the end of dark deep woods /1990./

1922 births
1985 deaths
Bosnia and Herzegovina writers
Yugoslav writers